Imre Asztrik Várszegi (born 26 January 1946) is a Hungarian Benedictine monk, who was ordained a priest on 29 August 1971. He served as Archabbot of the Pannonhalma Archabbey from 6 August 1991 to 16 February 2018. Previously, he functioned as Auxiliary Bishop of Esztergom between 1988 and 1991, and Titular Bishop of Culusi since then.

See also
Order of Saint Benedict
Pannonhalma Archabbey

References

External links
Profile at Catholic Hierarchy website 
Pannonhalma Archabbey  (Hungarian)

 
 

1946 births
Living people
Hungarian abbots
Benedictine abbots
People from Sopron
20th-century Hungarian Roman Catholic priests
Hungarian Benedictines
21st-century Hungarian Roman Catholic priests